The Audu Bako School of Agriculture in Dambatta, Kano State, Nigeria, awards diplomas in technical and vocational subjects for middle-level manpower. In 2005 the college had 400 students.
The college was established in 2002 and is owned and operated by Kano State. It is accredited to offer courses in agricultural and related technology, and a pre-ND course in Science and Technology.
It is named after Audu Bako, a former governor of the state.

In November 2006, it was among a number of polytechnics for which the National Board for Technical Education suspended admission of students for either failing to secure accreditation or running foul of the law.

Faculties and programmes
The College of Agriculture currently has only one faculty (Faculty of Agriculture) with only four programmes. These programmes include agricultural engineering/technology, agricultural technology, animal health and production technology and forestry technology.

Departments 

 Fisheries Technonlogy
 Pest Management Technology
 Home and Rural Economics
 Computer Science
 Crop Production Technology
 Animal Health & Husbandry
 Forestry Technology
 Agriculture
 Agric Extensions & Management
 Agricultural & Bio-Environmental Engineering Technology

References

External links 
 Official Website

External links
 http://abcoad.edu.ng

Universities and colleges in Nigeria
Kano State
2002 establishments in Nigeria
Educational institutions established in 2002
Academic libraries in Nigeria